Visionnaire is the fourth studio album by the French progressive death metal band Misanthrope.

Track listing

 "Future Futile" - 5:37
 "Bâtisseur de Cathédrale" - 5:36
 "Hypochondrium Forces" - 5:42 
 "Le Silence des Grottes" - 4:55 
 "2666" - 6:38
 "La Dandy" - 7:37
 "Hands of the Puppeteers" - 6:18
 "La Rencontre Rêvée" - 6:10
 "Irrévérencieux" - 6:21 
 "Visionnaire" - 9:06

External links
Visionnaire at Encyclopaedia Metallum

1997 albums
Misanthrope (band) albums
Albums produced by Fredrik Nordström